Grevillea brevifolia, commonly known as Cobberas grevillea, is a species of flowering plant in the family Proteaceae and is endemic to south-eastern continental Australia. It is a spreading shrub with hairy branchlets, elliptic leaves and clusters of hairy red flowers.

Description

Taxonomy
The specific epithet (brevifolia) means "short-leaved".

Distribution and habitat
Cobberas grevillea grows in alpine and subalpine woodlands, often in rocky places in north-eastern Victoria and as far north as Mount Kosciuszko in New South Wales.

References

External links
Herbarium specimen at Royal Botanic Gardens Kew

brevifolia
Flora of Victoria (Australia)
Flora of New South Wales
Proteales of Australia
Taxa named by George Bentham
Taxa named by Ferdinand von Mueller
Plants described in 1870